Mogul may refer to:

History
Mughal Empire, or any member of its ruling dynasty
Vicar Apostolic of Great Mogul, now the Roman Catholic Archdiocese of Bombay

Persons
Magnate
Mogul, Secret Service codename for President Trump
Business magnate, a prominent person in a particular industry
Media mogul, a person who controls, either through personal ownership or a dominant position, any media enterprise

Technology
Mogul (website), a social media network for women to share information
Mogul lamp (or six way lamp), a floor lamp which has a large center light bulb surrounded by three (or four) smaller bulbs
Mogul base, an E39 (39 mm) Edison screw fitting used in the above lamps, and some discharge lamps
HTC Mogul, a Windows Mobile 6.0/6.1 PDA
IHC Mogul, an early tractor by International Harvester
Starch mogul, a machine that moulds jelly beans or gummy candies in trays filled with cornstarch.

Entertainment
The Troubleshooters, or Mogul, a British television series made by the BBC between 1965 and 1972
The Moguls, a 2005 comedy film written and directed by Michael Traeger
Indy Mogul, a  DIY film making blog/forum site and series of podcasts/videos
Mogul (film), an upcoming Indian biographical film
Mogul skiing, a freestyle type of the sport
Grosso mogul (Great Moghul), violin concerto by Antonio Vivaldi

Video game
Baseball Mogul, a 1997 series of baseball simulation computer games created by Clay Dreslough
Casino Mogul, a 2002 economic simulation game for Windows
Hollywood Mogul, a computer game released in 1997 that allows players to take charge of a movie studio

Transport
Mogul, name for the 2-6-0 steam locomotive wheel arrangement
Mogul, the name of the first locomotive of GER Class 527, and the first 2-6-0 to be built for use in Great Britain
GWR Churchward Mogul, alternative name for the GWR 4300 Class built by the Great Western Railway from 1911
LMS Hughes Crab or Horwich Mogul, a class of mixed traffic 2-6-0 steam locomotive built between 1926 and 1932
LMS Stanier Mogul, a class of 2-6-0 mixed traffic steam locomotive (built 1933–1934)

Other
Mogul skiing, a freestyle skiing competition where skiers ski down a steep course of bumps or moguls
MOGUL framework, Modular Online Growth and Use of Language: a processing-based research framework for investigating languages in the mind
Mogul, Nevada, a small town in the United States
Federal-Mogul, an automotive parts supplier based in Southfield, Michigan, US
Project Mogul, a US military listening project using high altitude balloons
Mogul (horse) (born 2017), Thoroughbred racehorse
Mogul, a software package for data-mining crystallographic databases, distributed by the Cambridge Crystallographic Data Centre

See also
Mughal (disambiguation)
Moghuls (disambiguation)
Mogol (disambiguation)
Mongols, one or several ethnic groups